Arvind Giri (30 June 1958 – 6 September 2022) was an Indian politician. He was a five time member of Legislative Assembly and a runner up in Loksabha election in 2014, Uttar Pradesh of India. He represented the Gola Gokrannath Assembly constituency in Gola Gokarannath, Lakhimpur district of Uttar Pradesh.

Political career
Giri contested 2017 Uttar Pradesh Legislative Assembly election as Bharatiya Janata Party candidate from Gola Gokrannath Assembly constituency and defeated his close contestant Vinay Tiwari from Samajwadi Party with a margin of 55,017 votes.

From 19 March 2017  to 10 March 2022 he was a member of the 17th Legislative Assembly of Uttar Pradesh.

From 12 March 2022 to 6 September 2022 he was a member of the 18th Legislative Assembly of Uttar Pradesh

Death
Giri died of heart attack on 6 September 2022, at the age of 64.

References

1958 births
2022 deaths
People from Lakhimpur Kheri district
Bharatiya Janata Party politicians from Uttar Pradesh
Uttar Pradesh MLAs 2017–2022
Uttar Pradesh MLAs 2022–2027